The Faces of Janus is a book by A. James Gregor, in which the author argues that there are fundamental errors in Marxist analyses of fascism and that the political spectrum identifying the Left as progressive and the Right as reactionary was (in the words of Franklin Hugh Adler) a dishonest way of "privileging purported movements of the Left and demonizing movements of the Right".

Reviewer Harry V. Willems of the Southeast Kansas Library System writes: "Gregor takes issue with 20th-century historians who make fascism and communism the opposing faces of Janus. Gregor is the first to use Marxist theory systematically to bend the political spectrum from a linear to a circular form. That is, fascism and communism meld into each other. Fascism had its origins in communism, and communism exhibited facets of fascism from its inception." The American Historical Review wrote that Gregor argues that fascism was "a compelling and coherent synthesis of ideas generated by some of the most creative thinkers of our time."

References

The Faces of Janus: Marxism and Fascism in the Twentieth Century. By A. James Gregor. New Haven, CT: Yale University Press, 2000. 256p. .

2000 non-fiction books
Books about fascism
English-language books